The 1979 Portland State Vikings football team was an American football team that represented Portland State University as an independent during the 1979 NCAA Division I-AA football season. In its fifth season under head coach Mouse Davis, the team compiled a 6–5 record. The team utilized the run and shoot offense popularized by Davis. On the field, the team was led by junior quarterback Neil Lomax. Lomax became the all-time leader in college football history with a career total of 13,200 passing yards.

Schedule

Roster

References

Portland State
Portland State Vikings football seasons
Portland State Vikings football
Portland State Vikings football